Acalyptris fulva is a moth of the family Nepticulidae. It was described by Scoble in 1980. It is known from South Africa (It was described from the Kruger National Park).

References

Nepticulidae
Endemic moths of South Africa
Moths described in 1980